Exhibitionism is the act of exposing in a public or semi-public context one's intimate parts – for example, the breasts, genitals or buttocks. The practice may arise from a desire or compulsion to expose themselves in such a manner to groups of friends or acquaintances, or to strangers for their amusement or sexual satisfaction, or to shock the bystander. Exposing oneself only to an intimate partner is normally not regarded as exhibitionism. In law, the act of exhibitionism may be called indecent exposure, "exposing one's person", or other expressions.

History

Public exhibitionism by women has been recorded since classical times, often in the context of women shaming groups of men into committing, or inciting them to commit, some public action. The ancient Greek historian Herodotus gives an account of exhibitionistic behaviors from the fifth century BC in The Histories. Herodotus writes that: When people travel to Bubastis for the festival, this is what they do. Every baris carrying them there overflows with people, a huge crowd of them, men and women together. Some of the women have clappers, while some of the men have pipes which they play throughout the voyage. The rest of the men and women sing and clap their hands. When in the course of their journey they reach a community—not the city of their destination, but somewhere else—they steer the bareis close to the bank. Some of the women carry on doing what I have already described them as doing, but others shout out scornful remarks to the women in the town, or dance, or stand and pull up their clothes to expose themselves. Every riverside community receives this treatment.

A case of what appears to be exhibitionism in a clinical sense was recorded in a report by the Commission against Blasphemy in Venice in 1550.

In the UK the 4th draft of the revised Vagrancy Act of 1824 included an additional clause "or openly and indecently exposing their persons" which gave rise to difficulties because of its ill-defined scope. During the course of a subsequent debate on the topic in Parliament, the then Home Secretary, Mr Peel, observed that "there was not a more flagrant offence than that of indecently exposing the person which had been carried to an immense extent in the parks...wanton exposure was a very different thing from accidental exposure".

The development of new technologies such as smartphones and tablets has permitted some exhibitionists to reorient their methods such as with nude selfies.

Psychological aspects

The term exhibitionist was first used in 1877 by French physician and psychiatrist Charles Lasègue. Various earlier medical-forensic texts discuss genital self-exhibition, however.

When exhibitionistic sexual interest is acted on with a non-consenting person or interferes with a person's quality of life or normal functioning, it can be diagnosed as exhibitionistic disorder in the Diagnostic and Statistical Manual of Mental Disorders, fifth edition (DSM-5). The DSM states that the highest possible prevalence for exhibitionistic disorder in men is 2% to 4%. It is thought to be much less common in women. In a Swedish survey, 2.1% of women and 4.1% of men admitted to becoming sexually aroused from the exposure of their genitals to a stranger.

A research team asked a sample of 185 exhibitionists, "How would you have preferred a person to react if you were to expose your privates to him or her?" The most common response was "Would want to have sexual intercourse" (35.1%), followed by "No reaction necessary at all" (19.5%), "To show their privates also" (15.1%), "Admiration" (14.1%), and "Any reaction" (11.9%). Only very few exhibitionists chose "Anger and disgust" (3.8%) or "Fear" (0.5%).

Types of exposure
Various types of behavior are classified as exhibitionism, including:

 Anasyrma: the lifting of the skirt when not wearing underwear, to expose genitals.
 Candaulism: when a person exposes his or her partner in a sexually provocative manner.
 Flashing:
the momentary display of bare female breasts by a woman, with an up-and-down lifting of the shirt or bra
or, the exposure of a man's or woman's genitalia in a similar manner
 Martymachlia: a paraphilia which involves sexual attraction to having others watch the execution of a sexual act.
 Mooning: the display of bare buttocks by pulling down of trousers and underwear. The act is most often done for the sake of humour, disparagement, or mockery.
 Reflectoporn: the act of stripping and taking a photograph using an object with a reflective surface as a mirror, then posting the image on the Internet in a public forum. Examples include "images of naked men and women reflected in kettles, TVs, toasters and even knives and forks". The instance generally credited with starting the trend involved a man selling a kettle on an Australian auction site featuring a photograph where his naked body is clearly visible; other instances followed, and the specific term "reflectoporn" was coined by Chris Stevens of Internet Magazine. 
 Streaking: the act of running naked through a public place. The intent is not usually sexual but for shock value.
 Sexting: the act of sending, receiving, or forwarding sexually explicit messages, photographs, or videos.
 Telephone scatologia: the act of making obscene phone calls to random or known recipients. Some researchers have claimed that this is a variant of exhibitionism, even though it has no in-person physical component.

The DSM-5 diagnosis for exhibitionistic disorder has three subtypes: exhibitionists interested in exposing themselves to non-consenting adults, to prepubescent children, or to both.

See also

 Cyberflashing
 Dick pic
 Dogging (sexual slang)
 Histrionic personality disorder
 Human sexual activity
 Human sexuality
 Naturism
 Naked News
 Narcissism
 Nudity and sexuality
 Sexualization
 Sexual fetishism
 Sex-positive feminism
 Spring break
 Sheela na gig
 Toplessness
 Upskirt
 Voyeurism
 Wardrobe malfunction

References

External links 

  

Nudity
Paraphilias
Sex crimes
Sexual fetishism